The American Academy of Cosmetic Dentistry (AACD), founded in December 1984 by Dr. Jack Kammer and Dr. Jeff Morley of San Francisco, is the world's largest organization for cosmetic dental professionals.  As of 2001, the Academy had membership from 40 different countries.  Between 2000 and 2007, membership in the Academy jumped by 70% as United States oral health, in particular the incidence of tooth decay, improved markedly while competitively priced cosmetic procedures became more readily available.

One of the activities of the Academy, which it has done since its inception, has been surveying "American patients regarding esthetic dentistry and their personal preferences."  These surveys have been cited in popular media a number of times.

Presidents of the Academy serve one year terms.  Ken Glick of Toronto, Canada, served as the President in 1998.  Mike Malone was elected Vice President in 2001 and "will automatically ascend to President in two years."  Wynn Okuda was the 'president elect' in late 2002.  Laura Kelly of California became the Academy's first female president in 2007.  Kelly was followed in 2008 by Mickey Bernstein of Tennessee.

Accreditation Credential in Cosmetic Dentistry 

In 1983, Dr. Morley saw the need for a standardized credential in the newly emerging field of cosmetic dentistry. He formed AACD's Accreditation Program in 1985. With the help of Dr. Michael Miller, the AACD developed an examination process for cosmetic dentistry and began offering postgraduate certification in the field in 1986. The credential is available to both dentists and laboratory technicians, worldwide. While the American Dental Association has not recognized cosmetic dentistry as a specialty, a court case in Florida, Ducoin v Viamonte determined that AACD Accreditation is a legitimate credential that can be announced by a dentist to the public.

American Academy of Cosmetic Dentistry’s Charitable Foundation 

The American Academy of Cosmetic Dentistry's Charitable Foundation's (AACDCF) purpose is to serve the philanthropic efforts of the AACD. It maintains three programs: Give Back A Smile, the Give Back A Smile Whitening Program, and the Disaster Relief Fund.

Other activities

The AACD runs competitions for dental students.

References

External links
 AACD website

Dental organizations based in the United States
Medical and health organizations based in Wisconsin
Organizations established in 1984